Marko John "Mike" Todorovich (June 11, 1923 –  June 24, 2000) was an American basketball player and coach of Serbian descent born in St. Louis, Missouri. He played college basketball at the University of Wyoming. He also played college football at Washington University in St. Louis and the University of Notre Dame.

Todorovich began his professional career with the Sheboygan Red Skins of the National Basketball League (NBL). He was named NBL rookie of the year and chosen a first-team pick after a 1947–48 season in which he scored 777 points in 60 games. The other four first-team selections from that season—Jim Pollard, George Mikan, Red Holzman and Al Cervi—are enshrined in the Naismith Memorial Basketball Hall of Fame.  Sheboygan, however, suffered through a season of turmoil and finished with the second-worst record (23–37) in the franchise's 13-season history.  The following season, Todorovich again led the Red Skins in scoring, with 648 points in 60 games, and Sheboygan finished with a 35–29 record. He was named to the NBL's second team.

Later, he played for the St. Louis Bombers and the Tri-Cities Blackhawks.  He later would coach the Blackhawks for several games.

Career statistics

NBA

Source

Regular season

Playoffs

References

External links
 BasketballReference.com: Mike Todorovich (as player)
 BasketballReference.com: Mike Todorovich (as coach)

1923 births
2000 deaths
American men's basketball coaches
American men's basketball players
American people of Serbian descent
Basketball coaches from Missouri
Basketball players from Missouri
Centers (basketball)
Notre Dame Fighting Irish football players
Player-coaches
Power forwards (basketball)
Sheboygan Red Skins players
St. Louis Bombers (NBA) players
Tri-Cities Blackhawks head coaches
Tri-Cities Blackhawks players
Washington University Bears football players
Wyoming Cowboys basketball players